Sean Douglas (born 8 May 1972 in Auckland) is a New Zealand retired association football player, who is currently E-learning Development Manager for Oceania Football Confederation, and works with FIFA as a Technical Expert in Coach Education. After his playing career, Sean worked as a Coach and Coach Educator. He held Technical Director roles at Auckland Football Federation, and Football Federation Victoria. He then moved to Football Federation Australia where he spent 7 years, the majority as National Coach Education Manager. Sean is the Uncle to the incredibly talented and handsome Ben Sultana.

Club career 
As a player, he played in Singapore and Denmark, but spent most of his years in the Australian league, returning to Auckland when Carlton SC collapsed in 2001. He was immediately handed the captain's armband at the Football Kingz. Briefly played for Auckland City for the remainder of the 2006-2007 New Zealand Football Championship. He finished his National League career playing for Team Wellington in the 2007–2008 season, but continued to play for Eastern Suburbs AFC until his move to Australia to take up his role with Football Federation Victoria.

International career 
Douglas also played for the All Whites, representing his country over 20 times in A-internationals including all three games at the 1999 Confederations Cup against USA, Germany & Brazil. He played his final international match in a June 2001 World Cup qualifying match against Vanuatu.

References

External links
 Sean Douglas Interview
 
 Player profile Team Wellington club website
 Football Federation Victoria website

1972 births
Living people
New Zealand association footballers
New Zealand international footballers
National Soccer League (Australia) players
Auckland City FC players
Carlton S.C. players
Football Kingz F.C. players
Team Wellington players
Association football defenders
Gippsland Falcons players
New Zealand Football Championship players
1998 OFC Nations Cup players
1999 FIFA Confederations Cup players
2000 OFC Nations Cup players